Lincoln Yards is a mixed-use development project located on the North Side of Chicago between the Lincoln Park and Bucktown neighborhoods. It consists of several towers and high-rises that will include apartments, condos, office, retail, and entertainment.

Lincoln Yards will occupy more than 50 acres of land located on both sides of the North Branch of the Chicago River. It will be bounded by Webster Avenue to the north, Clybourn Avenue to the east, North Avenue to the south, and the Kennedy Expressway to the west.

History

A. Finkl & Sons Steel operated a mill along a roughly 22-acre lot along the eastern portion of the Chicago River in the Lincoln Park neighborhood from 1902 until it was demolished in 2012. The Lincoln Park location was Chicago's oldest steel mill. In 2006, it bought the site of the former Verson Steel on Chicago's South Side. It was purchased by a German company in 2008, and has since operated from that location. Since the demolition, there have been various proposals to connect the site to the popular Bloomingdale Trail.

In 2016, real estate developer company Sterling Bay purchased the Lincoln Park site for a sum over $100 million and renamed the site "Lincoln Yards". The developer released plans designed by Chicago-based architectural firm Skidmore, Owings, and Merrill in July 2018. In exchange for an increase in density to allow for the substantial construction, Sterling Bay is to pay an $89 million fee and will make infrastructure improvements in the neighborhood to ease the increase in traffic. Sterling Bay estimates the entire development will take up to ten years to complete when construction begins.

The development was to also include a stadium and a concert venue. Thomas Ricketts, owner of the Chicago Cubs, owns a stake in the stadium. A Live Nation music venue was also proposed. Some local residents indicated they did not want a stadium or a venue. In early 2019, a Chicago alderman suggested that the development include more parkland and green space instead.

Revised plans, released in January 2019, no longer included the stadium but instead incorporated more green space, roughly doubling the amount of space previously dedicated to parks. Ten aldermen out of the city's 50 aldermen declared their opposition to financing the revised project with $900 million of tax increment financing, arguing that more affordable housing should be provided on-site. However, with these changes to the plan, the development moved forward.

In April 2019, Mayor-elect Lori Lightfoot told the Chicago Sun-Times that her staff would, during her first post-election weekend, spend time examining the city's 600-page agreement with Sterling Bay regarding the development, believing that the city could reach a better deal.  Later that month the Chicago City Council approved plans for Lincoln Yards, including a tax increment financing agreement.

In 2019, a lawsuit filed against using over 1.3 billion dollars of TIF funds to pay for the development was filed but was unsuccessful.

In 2019, Mayor Lightfoot announced that an advisory council may monitor the site and proposed developments.

Potential tenants
The development was one of the proposed locations that could have hosted the second headquarters of Amazon if the company chose Chicago. Amazon representatives toured the site in 2017. Amazon ultimately split their proposal in half between two other locations.

References

External links
 Lincoln Yards Official Site

Buildings and structures in Chicago
Multi-building developments in Chicago